U Craiova 1948 Club Sportiv II, commonly known as Universitatea II Craiova, U II Craiovais the reserve squad of Romanian first league side, CS Universitatea Craiova.

History
The team was founded in the summer of 2014 from the desire of having a second senior squad where the players who finished the youth academy could be accommodated with the level of seniors, in the idea of being subsequently promoted to the first squad. The team was enrolled in the Liga IV – Dolj County where it was crowned as champion after just one season, winning the league, then the playoff tournament. The team qualified for the Liga III promotion play-off where they won without any problems, 12–0 on aggregate against Pandurii Cerneți, Mehedinți County champions.

After promotion, the satellite was managed by former Craiova players as Bogdan Vrăjitoarea, Corneliu Papură or Dragoș Bon and obtained following rankings: 2015–16 – 12th of 15, 2016–17 – 11th of 15 and 2017–18 – 5th of 15.

Grounds

Complexul Sportiv Ion Oblemenco
In the first season of its existence Universitatea II Craiova played all the home matches on the second ground from the Ion Oblemenco Sports Complex, near Ion Oblemeco Stadium.

Stadionul Oltenia
The promotion to Liga III was corroborated with the demolition of the stadium, fact that determined the move of the first squad from Ion Oblemenco Stadium to Extensiv Stadium and the move of the second team from Ion Oblemenco Sports Complex to Oltenia Stadium in Ișalnița, with a capacity of 2,000 seats.

Stadionul Extensiv
In 2016 CS Universitatea Craiova moved its official home matches to Municipal Stadium in Drobeta-Turnu Severin, action that caused the move of the satellite from Ișalnița back to Craiova, this time on Extensiv Stadium with a capacity of 7,000 seats.

On 10 November 2017 the reconstructed Ion Oblemenco Stadium was inaugurated with a friendly match between CS Universitatea Craiova and SK Slavia Prague. After this event, the first squad moved back to Ion Oblemenco Stadium and the second team remained for its official matches on Extensiv Stadium.

Honours

Leagues
Liga IV – Dolj County
Winners (1): 2014–15

Cups
Cupa României – Dolj County
Winners (1): 2014–15

Players

Second team squad

Out on loan

Club officials

Board of directors

 Last updated: 23 January 2022
 Source:

Current technical staff 

 Last updated: 8 March 2022
 Source: Technical staff

League history

Notable former players
The footballers enlisted below have had international cap(s) for their respective countries at junior and/or senior level and/or played in a fully professional league.

  Raoul Baicu
  Florin Borța
  Lucian Buzan
  Nicolae Calancea
  Paul Hodea
  Alin Manea
  Jovan Marković
  Simon Măzărache
  Valentin Mihăilă
  Robert Petre
  Alexandru Popescu
  Ionuț Trocan
  Ștefan Vlădoiu

Notable former managers

  Daniel Mogoșanu
  Corneliu Papură
  Bogdan Vrăjitoarea

References

External links
Official website

Association football clubs established in 2014
Football clubs in Dolj County
Sport in Craiova
Organizations based in Craiova
Liga III clubs
Liga IV clubs
CS
University and college association football clubs in Romania
 
2014 establishments in Romania